Zhou Yu (born 19 May 1992) is a Chinese male table tennis player. In 2012, he won Chinese National Championships at the age of twenty. He is the medalist in men's doubles event at both the 2013 and 2015 World Championships.

References

1992 births
Living people
Chinese male table tennis players
Asian Games medalists in table tennis
Table tennis players at the 2014 Asian Games
Asian Games gold medalists for China
Medalists at the 2014 Asian Games
Table tennis players from Jiangsu
People from Siyang County
World Table Tennis Championships medalists